Rose Montalbano [״Monty״] was a utility infielder who played from  through  in the All-American Girls Professional Baseball League.

Rose Montalbano saw limited action as a part-time infielder, playing mainly at second base for three clubs during her three years in the league. She was a member of the South Bend Blue Sox champion team in the 1951 and 1952 seasons, even though she did not play in the championship series.

Montalbano is part of Women in Baseball, a permanent display based at the Baseball Hall of Fame and Museum in Cooperstown, New York, which was unveiled in 1988 to honor the entire All-American Girls Professional Baseball League.

She has not been located since leaving the league.

Career statistics
Batting 

Fielding

Sources

All-American Girls Professional Baseball League players
Baseball players from New York (state)
People from Staten Island
Year of birth missing (living people)
Possibly living people